Luis Calderón Vega (1911–1989) was a Mexican politician and writer. Along with other leading opposition politicians, he was one of the founders of the National Action Party (PAN) in 1939.

Calderón Vega, who married María del Carmen Hinojosa González, was a prominent politician in his native Michoacán. He also authored several books, including the seminal political overview of the so-called "1915 Generation", Los Siete Sabios de México.  He served in the lower house of Congress, before resigning from the PAN in 1981, believing the party had abandoned the progressive ideals he favoured to become a right-wing party that served only the interests of the rich.

He was the father of Felipe Calderón, who was elected president in the 2006 presidential elections.

See also
Calderón Hinojosa family

Notes

External links
 Father of a Mexican President: Luis Calderon Vega

Members of the Chamber of Deputies (Mexico)
20th-century Mexican writers
20th-century Mexican male writers
Politicians from Michoacán
Writers from Michoacán
1911 births
1989 deaths
20th-century Mexican politicians